Dulwich Village is an affluent area of Dulwich in South London. It is located in the London Borough of Southwark.

History

"Dulwich Village" is also the name of the village High Street. Residents in Dulwich Village have to pay ground rent to the Dulwich Estate a landowning charitable organisation. Dulwich Village is entirely within the boundaries of the London Borough of Southwark and with the exception of one address near Dulwich Picture Gallery it is completely within the Dulwich Estate.

North Dulwich station is near the northern end of Dulwich Village and the P4 bus passes through the village. To the south is Gallery Road where the Dulwich Picture Gallery is located.

Dulwich College lies on the south side of the village.

Buildings of interest

Belair House, 1785
Dulwich Picture Gallery
Christ's Chapel

Local government elections 

2018 Council elections saw the Labour party gain two seats from the Conservatives.

2014 Council elections saw the Conservatives retain their two seats, with Labour gaining one off the Liberal Democrats, the Conservatives need a swing of 0.03% to gain the seat from Labour.

 
The 2010 election saw the Liberal Democrats gain a seat off the Conservatives. Crookshank-Hilton had previously been a Conservative ward councillor whom defected and sought re-election as a Liberal Democrat.

References 

Areas of London
Geography of the London Borough of Southwark
Streets in the London Borough of Southwark
Dulwich